Boomerang is an Australian television program which aired from 1961 to 1962 on Melbourne station GTV-9. A daytime program, it was hosted by Sybil Francis, and aired in a 30-minute time-slot. Among its segments was "Kangaroo Court", which featured discussion of controversial topics.

Early in its run, Boomerang aired on Thursdays at 2:00 PM, against Thursday Theatre on HSV-7. Towards the end of the series run, it aired at 1:00 PM, aired against Summer Science School on HSV-7 and a test pattern on ABV-2.

References

External links
 

1961 Australian television series debuts
1962 Australian television series endings
Australian television talk shows
Black-and-white Australian television shows
English-language television shows